List of Australian Paralympians that have competed in multiple sports at the Summer or Winter Paralympic Games. Several athletes have competed at both the Winter and Summer Paralympics.

Five athletes have won gold medals in more than one sport:

 Daphne Ceeney - Swimming (1960) and Table tennis (1964)
 Vic Renalson - Athletics (1968) and Weightlifting (1968, 1972, 1976)
 Roy Fowler - Swimming (1964) and Lawn bowls (1984, 1988)
 Greg Smith  - Athletics (2000) and Wheelchair rugby (2012)
 Dylan Alcott - Wheelchair basketball (2008) and Wheelchair tennis (2016)

(*) athletes who have won medals in more than one sport

References

See also 
 Australia at the Paralympics
 Australia at the Winter Paralympics
 Australia at the Summer Paralympics

Australia at the Paralympics